Alessandro Natta (7 January 1918 – 23 May 2001), was an Italian politician and secretary of the Italian Communist Party (PCI) from 1984 to 1988.

Before and during the World War
Born in Oneglia, Natta attended the Scuola Normale Superiore di Pisa together with the future President of the Italian Republic Carlo Azeglio Ciampi, and in that city he began taking part in the opposition to Benito Mussolini's Fascist regime.

During World War II, he was sent to Greece, and in the chaos following Italy's armistice with the Allies, took part in the defence of Gaddurà airport in Rhodes from German attacks. Captured, he refused to collaborate with the Germans and the Italian Social Republic and was consequently interned first in a prison camp on the island, then subsequently sent to a lager in Germany.

Role in the PCI
Natta returned to Italy only in August 1945, and joined the PCI in Imperia, dedicating himself to the party full-time. He was in turn a Comune councillor, secretary of the local PCI federation, and in time a leading participant in the party's internal life, becoming a member of its main organs along with Luigi Longo.

A strong supporter of the "Italian road to Socialism", he was close to Enrico Berlinguer, and gained a position in the party Secretariat. In 1969, he drew up the report proposing the expulsion from the party of the Manifesto group. In 1984, after Berlinguer's death, Natta was elected as party secretary. While still following Berlinguer's party line, he tried to improve the party's tense relations with the Communist Party of the Soviet Union. To this end he supported a trip to the Soviet Union organised by Armando Cossutta, which generated considerable controversy inside the party.

Split in the PCI
Natta was confirmed as leader during the Florence Congress in 1986, but in 1988 he was forced to resign by a heart attack and was succeeded by Achille Occhetto. Along with Cossutta, he strongly opposed Occhetto's proposal in the historic "Bolognina split" to change the party's name.

The dissolution of the PCI subsequent to Occhetto's victory led to the birth of two different parties, the majority Democratic Party of the Left under Occhetto and the hardline minority Communist Refoundation Party founded by Cossutta, Sergio Garavini, Lucio Libertini and others. Natta, like Pietro Ingrao, chose to remain a member of the main party, as he was not optimistic about the prospects of the new communist party.

References
Article by Luca Molinari at cronologia.leonardo.it
 

1918 births
2001 deaths
People from Imperia
Italian male journalists
Italian resistance movement members
Italian Communist Party politicians
University of Pisa alumni
Democratic Party of the Left politicians
20th-century Italian politicians
20th-century Italian journalists